In molecular biology, REBASE is a database of information about restriction enzymes and DNA methyltransferases. REBASE contains an extensive set of references, sites of recognition and cleavage, sequences and structures.  It also contains information on the commercial availability of each enzyme. REBASE is one of the longest running biological databases having its roots in a collection of restriction enzymes maintained by Richard J. Roberts since before 1980. Since that time there have been regular descriptions of the resource in the journal Nucleic Acids Research.

See also
 Restriction enzymes
 DNA methyltransferases

References

External links

 http://rebase.neb.com

Enzyme databases
Genetics databases
Restriction enzymes